Miraflores District may refer to several districts in Peru:

Miraflores District, Arequipa
Miraflores District, Huamalíes
Miraflores District, Lima
Miraflores District, Yauyos